"Shakespeare's Kingdom" is a poem written by Alfred Noyes and set to music by the English composer Edward Elgar.  It was one of the songs (also known as the "Pageant of Empire") written to be performed in the Pageant of Empire at the British Empire Exhibition on 21 July 1924.

The song is about the English poet, William Shakespeare, describing his arrival in London.

References

Foreman, Lewis (ed.),"Oh, My Horses! Elgar and the Great War", Elgar Editions, Rickmansworth, 2001 
Richards, Jeffrey "Imperialism and Music: Britain 1876-1953" (Manchester University Press, 2002)

External links 
 
Poemhunter.com Shakespeare's Kingdom by Alfred Noyes
Digital Collections Shakespeare's Kingdom

Songs by Edward Elgar
1924 songs
Cultural depictions of William Shakespeare
London in fiction
World's fair music
British Empire Exhibition